The list of ship launches in 2013 includes a chronological list of ships launched in 2013.


References

2013
Ship launches
 
Ship